Cyril Cazeaux (born 10 February 1995) is a French professional rugby union player. He currently plays at lock for Bordeaux Bègles in the Top 14.

References

External links
 UBB profile

Living people
1995 births
French rugby union players
Rugby union locks
US Dax players
Union Bordeaux Bègles players
People from Dax, Landes
Sportspeople from Landes (department)
France international rugby union players